Hanksville is an unincorporated village and census-designated place (CDP) in the town of Huntington, Chittenden County, Vermont, United States. It was first listed as a CDP prior to the 2020 census.

The village is in southeastern Chittenden County, in the southern part of the town of Huntington, in the valley of the Huntington River, a north-flowing tributary of the Winooski River. The main ridge of the Green Mountains rises to the east, running from  Burnt Rock Mountain in the north to  Molly Stark Mountain in the south. Main Road runs the length of the community, following the Huntington River; it leads north  to Huntington Center and south  to Vermont Route 17 at the western base of Appalachian Gap.

References 

Populated places in Chittenden County, Vermont
Census-designated places in Chittenden County, Vermont
Census-designated places in Vermont